Boltonia caroliniana,  common name Carolina doll's-daisy, is a North American species of plants in the family Asteraceae. It is found only in the southeastern United States, primarily in the states of North Carolina, South Carolina, and Virginia with a few isolated populations in western Georgia.

Boltonia caroliniana is a perennial herb up to 200 cm (80 inches) tall. It has many daisy-like flower heads with white or lilac ray florets and yellow disc florets.

References

Astereae
Flora of the Southeastern United States
Plants described in 1788
Flora without expected TNC conservation status